Anthony Elbert Cooper (July 20, 1904 – October 21, 1979) was an American Negro league shortstop between 1928 and 1941.

A native of Arkadelphia, Arkansas, Cooper was the brother of fellow Negro leaguer Darltie Cooper. Younger brother Anthony made his Negro leagues debut in 1928 with the Birmingham Black Barons, and ended his career with the New York Black Yankees in 1941. Cooper died in Schenectady, New York in 1979 at age 75.

References

External links
 and Seamheads
 Anthony Cooper at Arkansas Baseball Encyclopedia

1904 births
1979 deaths
Baltimore Black Sox players
Birmingham Black Barons players
Cleveland Red Sox players
Homestead Grays players
Louisville White Sox players
Newark Dodgers players
New York Black Yankees players
Pittsburgh Crawfords players
Baseball shortstops
Baseball players from Arkansas
People from Arkadelphia, Arkansas
20th-century African-American sportspeople